The Yamaha XT 550 was a motorcycle produced in Japan by the Yamaha Motor Company in 1982 and 1983

XT 550 had an innovative gas tank design, single over-head four valves camshafts, monoshock rear suspension and first on a motorcycle two-stage YDIS intake system.  The XT 550 engine was a replacement.

The XT 550 could easily reach 95 mph (152 km/h) .

References

External links
 "Yamaha XT550 Gets Transformed Into a Beautiful Board Tracker". High Snob Society.

XT550